Nine is the fifth studio album by the British rhythm and blues collective Sault, released on 25 June 2021 on Forever Living Originals. Produced by Inflo, the album was only available on streaming services and as a digital download for 99 days, until 2 October 2021. The album received widespread critical acclaim, appearing on several end-of-year lists and received praise for its diversity of musical genres and styles as well as the lyrics' exploration of the urban black experience.

Critical reception

 The editorial staff of AnyDecentMusic? characterized eight reviews as an 8.2 out of 10. Kitty Empire of The Observer rated the album five out of five stars, calling Nine a "masterclass in anger and balm" and praising the spoken-word sections of the release. Jem Aswad of Variety praised the music for being "Black-centric and racially based, and forceful without being dogmatic or too in-your-face", with the lyrics exploring the experience of growing up as a minority in Britain. Stereogum listed Nine as the album of the week, with reviewer Ryan Leas also noted how the release discusses the band members' origins and using the music to dig into "complexities and layers of Black experience". After the album had been made unavailable for streaming, Will Dukes wrote an ode to Nine for Rolling Stone, calling the album release strategy "a fitting tribute to our ephemeral age" and praising how the group balances competing emotions with music that "dances with that specific existential despair, at once lighthearted and deathly serious". Tarisai Ngangura of Pitchfork Media compares the "repetitive, earwormy melodies" paired with "ominous undertones" to children's rhymes; the review assess all tracks on the album pointing out the heavy lyrical themes and the band's ability to laugh through them.

Barney Harsent of The Arts Desk wrote a five-star review, calling this one of the albums of the year, noting the varied genres of music and instrumentation as well as the album's ability to heal. Sofie Lindevall of Gigwise scored Nine a nine out of 10 stars and points out the diversity of genres and the powerful social messaging, including the spoken word piece by Michael Ofo. Another nine out of 10 came from Uncuts John Lewis who points out how London-centric the music is. Kyle Mullin of Exclaim! scored Nine an eight out of 10 for the "multitude of genres, styles and moods" present on the tracks that "span a spectrum between polish and grit". The editorial board of AllMusic Guide gave this release four out of five stars and included it as the "Best of 2021", with reviewer Andy Kellman speculating that the tracks are outtakes from the band's previous albums, leading to the eclectic mix of styles that "play out like fragments of a concept album about grim street life caused by a lack of opportunities and endangered by a surplus of looming threats", but notes that even if they are outtakes, they are "no slapdash addendum" to the band's catalogue.

Track listing

Chart performance

Personnel
Sault
Kadeem Clarke
Dean Josiah "Inflo" Cover
Cleopatra "Cleo Sol" Nikolic
Melisa "Kid Sister" Young

Additional personnel
Michael Ofo – vocals on "Mike's Story"
Little Simz – vocals on "You from London"

References

External links

Aggregate reviews from Album of the Year
Review from Album Reviews blog
Review from Still Magazine

2021 albums
Albums produced by Inflo
Sault (band) albums
Self-released albums
Neo soul albums